Palparini is an antlion tribe in the subfamily Palparinae.

Genera 
19 genera belong to tribe Palparini:
 Crambomorphus McLachlan, 1867
 Golafrus Navás, 1912
 Goniocercus Insom & Carfi, 1988
 Indopalpares Insom & Carfi, 1988
 Isonemurus Esben-Petersen 1928
 Lachlathetes Navás, 1926
 Maula Navás, 1912
 Nosa Navás, 1911
 Palparellus  Navás, 1912
 Palpares Rambur, 1842
 Palparidius Péringuey, 1910
 Pamares Mansell, 1990
 Pamexis Hagen, 1866
 Parapalpares Insom & Carfi, 1988
 Pseudopalpares Insom & Carfi, 1988
 Stenares Hagen, 1866
 Tomatarella Kimmins, 1952
 Tomatares Hagen, 1866
 Valignanus Navás, 1913

References

External links 

Myrmeleontidae
Insect tribes